Phillips Waller Smith (June 28, 1906 – February 16, 1963) was a major general in the United States Air Force.

Smith was born in Saint Paul, Minnesota. He attended the University of Wisconsin-Madison, the Massachusetts Institute of Technology, and Harvard University.

Career
Smith graduated from the United States Military Academy in 1930. During World War II, he served with the United States Strategic Air Forces in Europe. In 1953, he was named Comptroller of Air Material Command.

Awards he received include the Legion of Merit with oak leaf cluster and the Army Commendation Medal.

References

1906 births
1963 deaths
People from Saint Paul, Minnesota
United States Air Force generals
Recipients of the Legion of Merit
United States Army Air Forces personnel of World War II
United States Military Academy alumni
University of Wisconsin–Madison alumni
Massachusetts Institute of Technology alumni
Harvard University alumni
Military personnel from Minnesota